MiKTeX is a free and open-source distribution of the TeX/LaTeX typesetting system for Microsoft Windows (and for Mac and certain Linux distributions such as Ubuntu, Debian and Fedora). It also contains a set of related programs. MiKTeX provides the tools necessary to prepare documents using the TeX/LaTeX markup language, as well as a simple TeX editor: TeXworks. The name comes from Christian Schenk's login: MiK for Micro-Kid.

MiKTeX can update itself by downloading new versions of previously installed components and packages, and has an easy installation process. Additionally, it can ask users whether they wish to download any packages that have not yet been installed but are requested by the current document.

The current version of MiKTeX is 21.12 and is available at the MiKTeX homepage. In June 2020, Schenk decided to change the numbering convention; the new one is based on the release date. Thus 20.6 was released in June 2020. Since version 2.7, MiKTeX has support for XeTeX, MetaPost and pdfTeX and compatibility with Windows 7. A portable version of MiKTeX, as well as a command-line installer of it, are also available.

See also

 LyX – An open-source cross-platform word processor
MacTeX
TeX Live
 Texmaker – An open-source cross-platform editor and shell
 TeXnicCenter – An open-source Windows editor and shell
 WinShell – A Windows freeware, closed-source multilingual integrated development environment (IDE)
 TeXstudio – An open-source cross-platform LaTeX editor.

References

External links
 MiKTeX project homepage
 

Free software programmed in C
Free software programmed in C++
Free software programmed in Pascal
Free TeX software
Linux TeX software
TeX software for Windows
TeX SourceForge projects